David Highbaugh Smith (December 19, 1854 – December 17, 1928) was a U.S. Representative from Kentucky.

Born near Hammonville, Hart County, Kentucky, Smith attended the public schools and the colleges at Horse Cave, Leitchfield, and Hartford, Kentucky.
He studied law.
He was admitted to the bar in 1876 and commenced practice in Hodgenville, Kentucky.
Superintendent of common schools for LaRue County in 1878.
County attorney for LaRue County 1878–1881.
He served as member of the State house of representatives 1881–1883.
He served in the State senate 1885–1893, and as president pro tempore 1891–1893.

Smith was elected as a Democrat to the Fifty-fifth and to the four succeeding Congresses (March 4, 1897 – March 3, 1907).
He was not a candidate for renomination in 1906.
He was one of the managers appointed by the House of Representatives in 1905 to conduct the impeachment trial proceedings against Charles Swayne, judge of the United States District Court for the Northern District of Florida.
He resumed the practice of law.
He served as president of the Farmers' National Bank of Hodgenville, Kentucky.
He died in Hodgenville, Kentucky, December 17, 1928.
He was interred in Red Hill Cemetery.

References

External links

 

1854 births
1928 deaths
Kentucky lawyers
Democratic Party Kentucky state senators
Democratic Party members of the Kentucky House of Representatives
People from Hart County, Kentucky
Democratic Party members of the United States House of Representatives from Kentucky
People from LaRue County, Kentucky
19th-century American lawyers